The Huff-Daland XHB-1 "Cyclops" was a 1920s American prototype heavy bomber designed and built by the Huff-Daland company.

Design and development
The XHB-1 was designed as an enlarged version of the earlier LB-1 powered by a single 750 hp Packard 2A-2540 nose-mounted engine. It had a crew of four and had a 4000 lb bomb load. The Army decided not to order the Cyclops into production as it had decided single-engined aircraft were not suitable for the role.

A twin-engined version was developed as the XB-1 Super Cyclops.

Operators

United States Army Air Corps

Specifications (XHB-1)

See also

References

Notes

Bibliography

 Andrade, John. U.S. Military Aircraft Designations and Serials since 1909. Leicester: Midland Counties Publications, 1979. . 
 The Illustrated Encyclopedia of Aircraft (Part Work 1982–1985). London: Orbis Publishing, 1985.

XHB-1
HB-01
Single-engined tractor aircraft
Biplanes